The Municipality of Macau was one of two municipalities of Macau, along with the Municipality of Ilhas.

Governance 
Its bodies were the municipal council (Câmara Municipal de Macau) and the municipal assembly (Assembleia Municipal de Macau) (Câmara Municipal de Macau Provisória and Assembleia Municipal de Macau Provisória after December 20, 1999). The two municipalities were replaced by the Civic and Municipal Affairs Bureau (Instituto para os Assuntos Cívicos e Municipais) in 2001.

History

In 1513, Portuguese explorer Jorge Álvares arrived in the Pearl River Delta, in the Shenzhen area, which he called Tamão. A Portuguese settlement was started there. By 1535 traders were allowed to anchor their ships in the harbour. In 1887, the Sino-Portuguese Treaty of Peking was signed, allowing "the perpetual occupation and government of Macau by Portugal".   
 
According to National Geographic, "Macau may never have existed if not for Tamão" where the Portuguese learned "how China, the Pearl River Delta, and the South China Sea worked". The settlement and Jorge Álvares "kickstarted a chain of events that ultimately spawned Macau". A large stone sculpture of Álvares stands in downtown Macau.

Freguesias

Demographics 
he population of the Macau Peninsula has been increasing rapidly for decades, particularly since the transfer of sovereignty to the People's Republic of China. With 45,675 inhabitants/km², Macau has in one of the highest population densities of any urban area.

See also
Municipality of Ilhas

References

External links
Law No. 17/2001 - Creation of the Civic and Municipal Affairs Bureau (in Chinese) (in Portuguese) - Dissolution of the Câmaras Municipal and Assembleias Municipal, and Establishment of Instituto para os Assuntos Cívicos e Municipais

Politics of Macau
Municipalities of Macau